Sergey Tarasov is a Russian pianist.

He was awarded 2nd prizes at the 1995 Ferruccio Busoni and Arthur Rubinstein competitions before winning the 1996 Sydney International Piano Competition. In 1988 he also won the 7th Prague Spring International Piano Competition. He subsequently obtained the 1998 International Tchaikovsky Competition's 4th prize, and won the 1999 Premio Jaén.

References

  Arthur Rubinstein International Music Society
  International Tchaikovsky Competition
  Kommersant - Photo archive.
  Fondazione Concorso Pianistico Internazionale Ferruccio Busoni
  Diputación de Jaén

Living people
Year of birth missing (living people)
Russian classical pianists
Male classical pianists
Prize-winners of the Ferruccio Busoni International Piano Competition
Prize-winners of the International Tchaikovsky Competition